D'Wayne "Dee" Eskridge (born March 23, 1997) is an American football wide receiver for the Seattle Seahawks of the National Football League (NFL). He played college football at Western Michigan.

Early life and high school
Eskridge was born and initially grew up in Winona, Mississippi, before his family moved to Bluffton, Indiana, while he was in grade school. He attended Bluffton High School, where he played football and was a sprinter on the track team. He was named Indiana's Mr. Track and Field as a senior. He committed to play college football at Western Michigan over Ball State, which was the only other FBS program to offer him a scholarship.

College career
Eskridge saw playing time as a reserve receiver as a freshman. Eskridge became a starter going into his sophomore season and finished the year with 30 receptions for 506 yards and three touchdowns. As a junior, he caught 38 passes for 776 yards and three touchdowns. Eskridge spent the offseason at cornerback and entered his senior year as a starter on both offense and defense. He broke his collarbone four games into the season and used a medical redshirt. As a redshirt senior, Eskridge returned to playing receiver while also taking on the Broncos' kickoff return duties. At the end of the season he was named first-team All-MAC as a receiver after leading the conference with 784 yards and eight touchdowns on 34 receptions and the MAC Special Teams Player of the Year after returning 16 kickoffs for 467 yards and one touchdown. Following the end of the season Eskridge participated in the 2021 Senior Bowl.

Professional career

Eskridge was selected by the Seattle Seahawks in the second round (56th overall) of the 2021 NFL Draft. On May 14, 2021, Eskridge signed his four-year rookie contract with Seattle, which was for $5.9 million in total in addition to a signing bonus of $1.6 million.

On October 7, 2021, Eskridge was placed on injured reserve with a concussion. He was activated on November 12. On December 5, Eskridge scored his first NFL touchdown on a 7-yard pass from Russell Wilson in a 30-23 victory over the San Francisco 49ers.

On November 26, 2022, Eskridge was placed on injured reserve with a broken hand.

References

External links
Western Michigan Broncos bio

1997 births
Living people
People from Winona, Mississippi
People from Bluffton, Indiana
Players of American football from Mississippi
Players of American football from Indiana
American football wide receivers
Western Michigan Broncos football players
Seattle Seahawks players